The 1978–79 Yugoslav First League season was the 33rd season of the First Federal League, the top level association football competition of SFR Yugoslavia, since its establishment in 1946. Hajduk Split won the league title.

A total of 18 teams competed in the league, with the defending champions Partizan nearly relegated, finishing the season in 15th place, one point above the relegation zone. Hajduk Split and Dinamo Zagreb both finished the season on 50 points, but Hajduk won the championship having the better goal difference. However, there was a controversy in the first round when Rijeka defeated Dinamo 2–1 at Kantrida. Dinamo claimed that Edmond Tomić, who joined Rijeka that season from Lirija, didn't serve a one-match suspension following two yellow cards received while playing for his former club. They appealed and after two months it has been decided to award the match 3–0 to Dinamo. After several appeals from both sides, in spring 1979 Football Association of Yugoslavia ruled in favour of Rijeka. The case was brought to Employment Appeal Tribunal, which four years later ruled Dinamo as champions.

The season began on 12 August 1978 and concluded on 17 June 1979. This was the third and last national title win for Hajduk under the guidance of manager Tomislav Ivić, who previously led the club to four consecutive Yugoslav Cup wins in 1972, 1973, 1974 and 1976 (not contested in 1975). Striker Dušan Savić of Red Star was the top goalscorer with 24 goals. This was the second achievement for Savić, who previously topped the scoring table in the 1974–75 season. Rijeka entered the 1979–80 European Cup Winners' Cup, after defeating Partizan in the final of Yugoslav Cup with an aggregate score 2–1.

Teams
A total of eighteen teams contested the league, including sixteen sides from the 1977–78 season and two sides promoted from the 1977–78 Yugoslav Second League (YSL) as winners of the two second level divisions East and West. The league was contested in a double round robin format, with each club playing every other club twice, for a total of 34 rounds. Two points were awarded for wins and one point for draws.

Čelik Zenica and Trepča Kosovska Mitrovica were relegated from the 1977–78 Yugoslav First League after finishing the season in bottom two places of the league table. The two clubs promoted to top level were Napredak Kruševac and Željezničar Sarajevo.

League table

Results

Winning squad
Source:

Top scorers

See also
1978–79 Yugoslav Second League
1978–79 Yugoslav Cup
1978–79 NK Hajduk Split season

External links

Yugoslavia Domestic Football Full Tables

Yugoslav First League seasons
Yugo
1978–79 in Yugoslav football